Second-seeded Sarah Cooke defeated first-seeded Pauline Betz 7–5, 6–2 in the final to win the women's singles tennis title at the 1941 U.S. National Championships. The tournament was played on outdoor grass courts and held from August 30, through September 7, 1941 at the West Side Tennis Club in Forest Hills, Queens, New York.

The draw consisted of 62 players of which eight were seeded.

Seeds
The eight seeded U.S. players are listed below. Pauline Betz is the champion; others show in brackets the round in which they were eliminated.

  Pauline Betz (finalist)
  Sarah Cooke (champion)
  Dorothy Bundy (quarterfinals)
  Helen Bernhard (quarterfinals)
  Helen Jacobs (semifinals)
  Margaret Osborne (semifinals)
  Mary Arnold (third round)
  Virginia Kovacs (first round)

Draw

Final eight

References

1941
1941 in American women's sports
1941 in women's tennis
Women's Singles
Women's sports in New York (state)
Women in New York City
1941 in New York City
Forest Hills, Queens